was a prominent Japanese physicist and Marxist. He published his Doctrine of the Three Stages of Scientific Development in 1936. This was the first Japanese contribution to the philosophy of science.

He was jailed in 1938 following making contributions to the Marxist journal Sekai Bunka (World Culture). However, following the intervention of Yoshio Nishina, he was released into the custody of his professor, Hideki Yukawa.

Doctrine of the Three Stages of Scientific Development
Taketani applied Hegel's theory of dialectics, with the triad Phenomenon, Substance, and Essence. Having worked with Yukawa as he developed his discovery of the meson, he used this as an example of a new substance. With his fellow peer and collaborator Shoichi Sakata, Taketani developed a Marxist philosophy of science known as the three-stages theory. According to the theory, science starts from a Phenomenal Stage where its role is to describe our experience. Next, science then asks what sort of substance may make up the objects of experience, and also what is the structure they may have, which he calls the Substantial Stage. However, he then argues the question of an essence of both substance and  phenomenon emerges as the Essential Stage, which syntheses of the previous two stages. The process is then reiterated with a similar cycle repeated at a higher level.

References

Is Philosophy of Science Alive in the East? A Report from Japan by Soshichi Uchii, accessed 12 January 2008

1911 births
2000 deaths
Japanese Marxists
Japanese physicists
Philosophers of science
Kyoto University alumni
Riken personnel